"Give It to Me Straight" is a song co-written and recorded by Canadian country artist Tenille Arts. The song was co-written with Dave Pittenger and Allison Veltz. It was only released to radio in Canada, where it was the lead single off her third studio album Girl to Girl.

Background
Arts described the track as a "pre-breakup song" saying it is about "when you just want someone to cut to the chase and tell you why you’re really breaking up".

Critical reception
Jonathan Andre of 365 Days of Inspiring Media called the song "catchy and compelling", saying it "hits all the right notes".

Music video
The official music video for "Give It to Me Straight" features Arts singing in many different outfits and was directed by Grant Claire. It premiered on April 19, 2021.

Charts
"Give It to Me Straight" reached a peak of number six on the Billboard Canada Country chart dated July 24, 2021, marking Arts' biggest hit in her home country to date.

References

2021 songs
2021 singles
Tenille Arts songs
Songs written by Tenille Arts